Big Cormorant Lake  is located in northwestern Minnesota's Becker County, about an hour's drive due east of the Fargo, North Dakota and Moorhead, Minnesota metropolitan area. Public access boat ramps are located on the northeast and west sides of the Lake.

The lake was named after the cormorant bird, a common bird in the region. In 2015, the lake was discovered to be infested with zebra mussels, which threatens neighboring lakes. Cormorant Lake is situated near the towns of Detroit Lakes, Minnesota, Lake Park, Minnesota, Audubon, Minnesota and the Cormorant Township.

History
The land that Big Cormorant Lake sits on was originally occupied by the Chippewa (Ojibwe), and the Sioux Native tribes. The Cormorant Township organized on February 26, 1872, and the name Cormorant is translated from the original Ojibway naming of the lake. In 1867, a treaty was signed establishing the White Earth Reservation, a large tract of land in the northern part of Becker County, to be home for the Chippewa Indians.

Attractions and activities
Some of the most popular attractions on Big Cormorant Lake come in the form of restaurants. Hooligan's Lakeside, Cormorant Pub and Boat House, Parallel 46/Cormorant Inn, Zorbaz on Pelican Lake, the Roadhouse, and Pit 611 offer lake residents food and entertainment. Boutique shopping is also available in Cormorant Village.

For over 100 years, YMCA Camp Cormorant has offered spirit, tradition, leadership and exceptional facilities to campers. Founded in 1903, Camp Cormorant is one of the oldest overnight camps in the entire nation and continues to be a tremendous growing up experience for children and teens. The camp is nestled on 80 acres of wooded property with an extensive beach front on Big Cormorant Lake.

Boating, sailing, and fishing are the most common activities on Cormorant Lake.

Other activities on Big Cormorant include swimming, kayaking, wakesurfing, waterskiing, wakeboarding and standup paddleboarding during the summer, and ice fishing and snowmobiling during the winter.

In media
Cormorant Village went viral for electing a dog named Duke for four terms as Mayor. Duke was a Great Pyrenees and passed away Feb 21, 2019.

A popular YouTube channel named CBOYSTV films and is headquartered at Cormorant Lake. CBoysTV is an American comedy and motorsports channel consisting of five guys. Their channel has amassed over 1 million subscribers.

Wildlife

Fish to catch

Black Bullhead
Black Crappie
Bluegill
Brown Bullhead
Carp
Green Sunfish
Hybrid Sunfish
Largemouth Bass
Northern Pike
Pumpkinseed
Rock Bass
Smallmouth Bass
Walleye
White Sucker
Yellow Bullhead
Yellow Perch

Invasive species
Zebra Mussel

Eurasian Milfoil
Spiny waterflea
Starry Stonewort

Climate
Because of its location in the Great Plains and its distance from both mountains and oceans, Cormorant Lake has an extreme humid continental climate (Köppen Dfa/Dfb), featuring long, bitterly cold winters and warm to hot, humid summers. Summers have frequent thunderstorms, and the warmest month of the year is July.

Temperature and precipitation

Ice In - Out

Neighboring lakes
 Leaf Lake (Becker County Minnesota)
 Pelican Lake (Otter Tail County, Minnesota)
 Little Cormorant Lake
 Middle Cormorant Lake
 Upper Cormorant Lake
 Lake Ida
 Lake Maud
 Lake Nelson

Adjacent townships
 Cormorant Township (south)
 Lake Park Township (north)
 Audubon Township (northeast)
 Lake Eunice Township (east)
 Dunn Township, Otter Tail County (southeast)
 Scambler Township, Otter Tail County (south)
 Tansem Township, Clay County (southwest)
 Parke Township, Clay County (west)
 Eglon Township, Clay County (northwest)

See also
List of lakes in Minnesota

References

Lakes of Becker County, Minnesota
Lakes of Minnesota